This is a list of the 59 Members of Parliament (MPs) elected to the House of Commons of the United Kingdom by Scottish constituencies for the Fifty-fourth Parliament of the United Kingdom (2005 to 2010) at the 2005 United Kingdom general election.

Composition at election

Composition at dissolution

List

By-elections 
 2005 Livingstone By-election, Jim Divine, Labour
2006 Dunfermline and West Fife By-election, Willie Rennie, Liberal Democrats
2008 Glasgow East By-election, John Mason, SNP
2009 Glasgow North East By-election, Willie Bain, Labour

See also 

 Lists of MPs for constituencies in Scotland

Lists of UK MPs 2005–2010
Lists of MPs for constituencies in Scotland
2005 United Kingdom general election